Nils Schmäler (born 10 November 1969) is a German former professional footballer who played as a defender. He spent six seasons in the Bundesliga with VfB Stuttgart and Dynamo Dresden. His twin brother Olaf Schmäler also played professionally. As of 2008, he worked as a scout for Manchester United.

Honours
VfB Stuttgart
 UEFA Cup finalist: 1989
 Bundesliga: 1992

External links

1969 births
Living people
German footballers
Association football defenders
Germany under-21 international footballers
Eintracht Braunschweig players
Bundesliga players
VfB Stuttgart players
VfB Stuttgart II players
Dynamo Dresden players
SpVg Aurich players
Manchester United F.C. non-playing staff
German twins
Twin sportspeople
People from Lüneburg
Footballers from Lower Saxony
West German footballers